Piyush Tewari is an Indian social entrepreneur, focused on improving road safety, access to emergency medical care and urban governance across India. He is the Founder and CEO of SaveLIFE Foundation, and best known for his work to pass a Good Samaritan Law in India. In 2016, GQ Magazine named him as one of the most influential young Indians. In 2014, Tewari was featured as an expert on Satyamev Jayate, a popular TV show on social issues, hosted by actor Aamir Khan. The episode Tewari was featured in was focused on the epidemic of road accidents in India.

He is also an empaneled speaker with The Outstanding Speakers Bureau, and is the subject of "The Golden Hour", a feature documentary produced by Roma Sur and Jessica McGough of the Film School at University of Colorado, Denver, USA. He is a commentator on Road Safety in Indian media and has been covered by the New York Times, TIME Magazine, and National Geographic, among other media outlets.

Early life and career
Tewari was born in Kanpur, India to Reena and Vinay Tewari on 19 May 1980. Tewari finished high school from Naval Public School in New Delhi. He holds a Bachelor of Information Technology degree from Delhi University, and a Master of Public Administration degree from Harvard University.

During his time in college, Tewari was actively involved with AIESEC, a global student-led non-profit. Immediately after college, he joined the India Brand Equity Fund (IBEF), an initiative of the Government of India. Following his stint at IBEF, in 2006 he joined the Calibrated Group — a US-based private-equity firm. In 2008, he became the Managing Director of the company’s operations in India.

SaveLIFE Foundation
Tewari founded the SaveLIFE Foundation (SLF) on 29 February 2008, following the death of a young cousin in a road crash. In response to the tragedy, he studied the issue of road safety and discovered that over 1 million people had been killed in road crashes in India in the previous decade. He also discovered that 50% of these deaths were due to lack of timely care, as confirmed by the Law Commission of India in its 201st report.

SLF started by training police and Indian citizens to become better responders to the injured. Over time, the organization started advocating for systemic changes to save lives. In 2015, Tewari and SLF got a ban imposed on trucks from carrying protruding rods. In 2016, SLF, through a writ petition to the Supreme Court of India, successfully advocated for a Good Samaritan Law in India as a provision protecting personal well-being. In 2017, a bill recommended by SLF to improve road safety in the country was passed by the Lok Sabha.

SLF is now focusing on implementation of road safety best-practices. As part of that focus, it has adopted the Mumbai-Pune Expressway to make it fatality-free by 2020.

Personal life 
Tewari has two siblings: a sister, Neha and a brother, Anshul. Anshul is the founder of Youth Ki Awaaz, the largest youth-based media platform in India.

Honours and Awards
 2010: Rolex Laureate, Rolex Awards for Enterprise
 2011: AIESEC India Alumni Entrepreneurship & Leadership Award
 2012: Echoing Green Fellowship
 2013: Ashoka Fellowship
 2014: Profiled by Satyamev Jayate TV show hosted by actor Aamir Khan
 2015: GQ India Man of the Year
 2015: TIME Magazine Next Gen Leader
 2016: GQ India Most Influential Young Indians
 2016: Profiled by New York Times
 2016: Profiled by National Geographic Magazine
 2017: Draper Richard Kaplan Foundation Fellowship
 2017: IRF Road Safety Award 2017
 2018: Mulago Foundation's Rainer Arnhold Fellowship
 2019: World Economic Forum Young Global Leader
 2020: GQ Heroes 2020
 2023: The Elevate Prize 2023

References

Living people
1980 births
Delhi University alumni
Harvard Kennedy School alumni
Indian chief executives